Javanrud County is in Kermanshah province, Iran, part of what is unofficially referred to as Iranian Kurdistan. The capital of the county is the city of Javanrud. At the 2006 census, the county's population was 62,259 in 13,629 households. The following census in 2011 counted 71,235 people in 17,854 households. At the 2016 census, the county's population was 75,169 in 20,592 households.

The county is bounded in the north and west by Paveh County and Kurdistan province, in the southeast by Ravansar County, and in the southwest by Sarpol-e Zahab County.

Administrative divisions

The population history of Javanrud County's administrative divisions over three consecutive censuses is shown in the following table. The latest census shows two districts, four rural districts, and one city.

References

 

Counties of Kermanshah Province